Todor Vasilev,  known professionally as Teddy Lion, is a singer, songwriter, guitar player and music producer from Poreč, Croatia. In his career, Teddy Lion has transitioned from the lead guitar player in the band "Triangl" to an established vocalist, producer and composer, working across Europe.

Biography

Early life and career beginnings
Teddy Lion showed interest in music at a very young age and while living in Skopje he was admitted to the Pedagogue Academy of Music in Skopje. In the meanwhile he visits Switzerland and becomes part of the international band "Phoenix". He returns to Skopje and enters one of the most famous bands on the Balkans "Triangl". as a lead guitar player, with whom he records his first vinyl record. The years that follow, he was mostly at concerts and working as a studio guitar player for Radio and Television Skopje on many projects, as well on other radio and TV events.

In the late 80's he moves to Croatia at the Adriatic coast. There he opens a private Piccadilly sound and media Studio, along with his brother Bobby Rosso and here is where he creates most of his work. During that period he travels to Vienna, Austria to play with the music band "Face to Face", close friends and co-workers with the great Austrian pop star Falco. That period of his life, He circled Europe on a music tours  and as a studio guitar player worked on several high-end music projects.

Band formation, Teddy Lion Selection 
In 1992, Teddy Lion founds his own music group "Teddy Lion selection". In 1995 he issues his first own guitar project on a CD for the Austrian discography house "Active Sound Studio" and the German "CKDC". Soon after followed a series of events across Mallorca and Canary islands in Spain, Austria, Switzerland, Italy, Scandinavia etc.
Teddy Lion selection has published 5 albums for discography houses "MCP records"(Austria), "VM-records"(Euro trend music) and "KOCH Musikverlage"(Germany) which have sold more than 100.000 CD's along Europe. "MCP records" Austria has awarded the Teddy Lion Selection with GOLDEN DISC award.

Solo Performance
Growing in southern Europe together with the irregular rhythms of traditional folklore, Teddy Lion grew up and evolved in an excellent, notable, professional polyvalent guitar player. During his music career, he managed to create his own recognizable style of playing and ability to produce notable music. In 1996 he published his solo album "Impressions" for "Aktiv Sound Studio" Germany.

Discography
Solo albums
 1996: "Impressions"
Studio albums
with Group Teddy Lion Selection
 1995: "El Mariachi: Latino Party vol 1"
 1997: "Caribbean Latin Party"
 1999: "Ole ola Cerveza"
2016: "Leone"

Awards and achievements

"Golden Disc" music award, MCP Austria

External links
https://www.glasistre.hr/pula/grupa-leone-objavila-album-prvijenac-578420
Official Website
MCP Austria Official Website

References

1960 births
Living people